The rainbowfish or Melanotaeniidae is a family of small, colourful freshwater fish found in northern and eastern Australia, New Guinea (including islands in Cenderawasih Bay and Raja Ampat Islands in Indonesia), Sulawesi and Madagascar.

The largest rainbowfish genus, Melanotaenia, derives from the ancient Greek melano (black) and taenia (banded).  Translated, it means "black-banded", and is a reference to the often striking lateral black bands that run along the bodies of those in the genus Melanotaenia.

Characteristics
The Melanotaeniidae is characterised by having their distal premaxillary teeth enlarged. They have a compressed body with the two dorsal fins being separated but with only a small gap between them. There are 3–7 spines in the first dorsal fin while the second has 6–22 rays, with the first ray being a stout spine in some species, the anal fin has 10–30 rays and, again, the first may be a stout spine in some species. The lateral line is either weakly developed or absent. They have comparatively large scales and these number 28–60 in the lateral series. The pelvic fins are attached to the fish’s abdomen by a membrane which runs along the length of the innermost ray and this is a feature which  can be used to separate rainbowfishes from silversides, although the membrane is easily torn. The majority of the species in this family demonstrate conspicuous sexual dimorphism, with the males usually being the more colorful sex and also showing an elongated median fin ray.

They live in a wide range of freshwater habitats, including rivers, lakes, and swamps. Although they spawn all year round, they lay a particularly large number of eggs at the start of the local rainy season. The eggs are attached to aquatic vegetation, and hatch seven to 18 days later. Rainbowfish are generalized omnivores, feeding on small crustaceans, insect larvae, and algae.

Melanotaenia, Pseudomugil, and several other genera of rainbowfish include species that regularly appear in the aquarium trade. In the wild, some rainbowfish populations have been severely affected by the aggressive introduced eastern mosquitofish (Gambusia holbrooki), tilapia cichlids, and pollution.

Classification
Melanotaeniidae is divided into a number of subfamilies; these families have been considered by some authorities to separate families, but the 5th Edition of Fishes of the World classifies these as subfamilies of a single family as they form a monophyletic group or clade. They are therefore classified as follows:
 Subfamily Bedotiinae Jordan & Hubbs, 1919 Madagascar rainbowfishes
 Genus Bedotia Regan, 1903
 Genus Rheocles Jordan & Hubbs, 1919
 Subfamily Melanotaeniinae Gill, 1894 Rainbowfishes
 Genus Chilatherina Regan, 1914
 Genus Glossolepis M. C. W. Weber, 1907
 Genus Melanotaenia T.N. Gill, 1862
 Genus Cairnsichthys G. R. Allen, 1980
 Genus Rhadinocentrus Regan, 1914
 Genus Iriatherina Meinken, 1974
 Genus Pelangia G. R. Allen, 1998
 Subfamily Pseudomugilinae Kner, 1867 Blue-eyes
 Genus Kiunga G. R. Allen, 1983
 Genus Pseudomugil Kner, 1866
 Genus Scaturiginichthys Ivantsoff, Unmack, Saeed & Crowley, 1991
 Subfamily Telmatherininae Munro, 1958 Celebes rainbowfishes
 Genus Kalyptatherina Saeed & Ivantsoff, 1991
 Genus Marosatherina Aarn, Ivantsoff & Kottelat, 1998
 Genus Paratherina Kottelat, 1990
 Genus Telmatherina Boulenger, 1897
 Genus Tominanga Kottelat, 1990

Behaviour in captivity

Rainbowfish usually do best with tropical community fish, such as tetras, guppies, and other rainbowfish. However, two males may sometimes fight at breeding season if there are not enough females. Rainbowfish usually eat floating flakes in captivity, because in the wild they will often eat insects floating on the surface.

In a home setting, these fish need well-oxygenated water with a pH level of 6.8 - 7.2, optimal temperatures varying between 72-82°F (22-28°C), and plenty of aquatic plants to give them hiding places amid their school. If properly cared for, Rainbowfish can live up to 5 years in captivity.

References

External links
 ANGFA – Australia New Guinea Fishes Association, an international organization responsible for the quarterly publication of the color journal Fishes of Sahul and a quarterly newsletter devoted to the keeping and discussion of native fishes in Australia and New Guinea (the geographical region known as Sahul)
 Home of the Rainbowfish – Adrian Tappin's extensive information pages which promote the aquarium keeping, study and conservation of the rainbowfish species of Australia and New Guinea, and provide free and valuable information to the general public
 Rainbowfish Species Easy to use information on keeping rainbowfish in the aquarium
 Rainbowfish discussion forum
 Rainbowfish discussion forum (mostly Europeans & Australians)

Atheriniformes
Ray-finned fish families
Taxa named by Theodore Gill